Hyposmocoma mokumana is a species of moth of the family Cosmopterigidae. It is endemic to Necker Island. The type locality is Annexation Hill.

The wingspan is 11.4–14.3 mm.

The larval case is purse-shaped and 7.4–8.9 mm in length. It is smooth and cylindrical, bulged and flat medially, with growth lines starting at middle and extending toward two entrances situated laterally. The background color is brown.

Adults were reared from case-making larvae. Cases were collected in Sesbania litter.

External links
New species of Hyposmocoma (Lepidoptera, Cosmopterigidae) from the remote Northwestern Hawaiian Islands of Laysan, Necker, and Nihoa

mokumana
Endemic moths of Hawaii
Moths described in 2009